is a waterfall in the city of Yurihonjō, Akita Prefecture, Japan, on the Akasawa River, a tributary of the Koyoshi River system in the foothills of Mount Chōkai. It is one of "Japan’s Top 100 Waterfalls", in a listing published by the Japanese Ministry of the Environment in 1990.

Since December 17, 1960, the waterfall and its associated plunge pool have been protected as an Akita Prefectural Place of Scenic Beauty and a Prefectural Natural Monument

External links
  Ministry of Environment

Waterfalls of Japan
Landforms of Akita Prefecture
Tourist attractions in Akita Prefecture
Yurihonjō